Anaphase-promoting complex subunit 2 is an enzyme that in humans is encoded by the ANAPC2 gene.

A large protein complex, termed the anaphase-promoting complex (APC), or the cyclosome, promotes metaphase-anaphase transition by ubiquitinating its specific substrates such as mitotic cyclins and anaphase inhibitor, which are subsequently degraded by the 26S proteasome. Biochemical studies have shown that the vertebrate APC contains eight subunits. The composition of the APC is highly conserved in organisms from yeast to humans. The product of this gene is a component of the complex and shares sequence similarity with a recently identified family of proteins called cullins, which may also be involved in ubiquitin-mediated degradation.

Interactions
ANAPC2 has been shown to interact with ANAPC1 and ANAPC11.

References

External links

Further reading